Tachytrechus sanus is a species of long-legged fly in the family Dolichopodidae.

References

Further reading

External links 

 

Dolichopodinae
Articles created by Qbugbot
Insects described in 1877
Taxa named by Carl Robert Osten-Sacken